Bozidar Cuk (Serbian Cyrillic: Божидар Чук; born ) is a Montenegrin male volleyball player. He is part of the Montenegro men's national volleyball team. On club level he played for Greek powerhouse Olympiacos during the season 2015–16.

References

External links
 profile at FIVB.org

1992 births
Living people
Montenegrin men's volleyball players
Olympiacos S.C. players
Place of birth missing (living people)